Kochu Hassan Kunju Bahadoor (1835–1926) was born to a Muslim family in Quilon district (now Kollam district) in the Indian state of Kerala. His father was a well-known trader in Travancore, Sahib Bahadur Syed Kunju, who imported dates from the Persian Gulf area as well as traded in sulphur and nitrate. Bahadoor was nominated to Travancore Legislative Council by the Travancore ruler and was later a member of India's first elected assembly, the Sree Moolam Popular Assembly.

References

1835 births
1926 deaths
Members of the Sree Moolam Popular Assembly